Middlefield is a mansion in Stapleford, Cambridgeshire, England, designed in 1908–9 by Edwin Lutyens. It is a grade II* listed building.

Middlefield was designed for Henry Bond, a lecturer in Roman Law at Trinity College and Trinity Hall, University of Cambridge, and subsequently the Master of Trinity Hall. The red-brick house is characterised by a symmetrical frontage, three large chimney blocks, and large tiled hipped roofs with low flanking eaves.

References

Works of Edwin Lutyens in England
Grade II* listed buildings in Cambridgeshire
Country houses in Cambridgeshire